Boisé-des-Muir Ecological Reserve is an ecological reserve of Quebec, Canada. It was established in 1995.

References

External links
 Official website from Government of Québec

Protected areas of Montérégie
Nature reserves in Quebec
Protected areas established in 1995
1995 establishments in Quebec
Le Haut-Saint-Laurent Regional County Municipality